In enzymology, a gibberellin-44 dioxygenase is an enzyme that catalyzes the chemical reaction

gibberellin 44 + 2-oxoglutarate + O2  gibberellin 19 + succinate + CO2

The 3 substrates of this enzyme are gibberellin 44, 2-oxoglutarate, and O2, whereas its 3 products are gibberellin 19, succinate, and CO2.

This enzyme belongs to the family of oxidoreductases, specifically those acting on paired donors, with O2 as oxidant and incorporation or reduction of oxygen. The oxygen incorporated need not be derived from O2 with 2-oxoglutarate as one donor, and incorporation of one atom o oxygen into each donor.  The systematic name of this enzyme class is (gibberellin-44),2-oxoglutarate:oxygen oxidoreductase. Other names in common use include oxygenase, gibberellin A44 oxidase, and (gibberellin-44), 2-oxoglutarate:oxygen oxidoreductase.  This enzyme participates in diterpenoid biosynthesis.  It employs one cofactor, iron.

References

 

EC 1.14.11
Iron enzymes
Enzymes of unknown structure